Ūdrīši Parish is an administrative unit of Krāslava Municipality in the Latgale region of Latvia.

Villages and settlements of Ūdrīši parish 
 Augstkalne (parish centre)

Parishes of Latvia
Krāslava Municipality
Latgale